Dhool is a 2011 Indian Kannada-language romantic action film written and directed by Dharani, son of director M. S. Rajashekar in his second directorial venture after Baalashiva. The film was produced by M. H. Sunil. The film stars Yogesh, Aindrita Ray and Prakash Raj. It was a remake of Tamil hit film, Thiruvilaiyaadal Aarambam directed by Boopathy Pandian. Prakash Raj reprised his own role from the original version. The film stars the soundtrack and original scores composed by V. Harikrishna.

The film released on 29 April 2011 across Karnataka to positive response. However critics noted that the remake version could not match up to its original Tamil version. The film was also dubbed into Hindi as Dildaar in 2013. The film collected 1,00,00,000 rupees at box office.

Plot
Guru (Yogesh), an unemployed youth is a carefree guy. He meets Priya (Aindrita) in a temple and instantly falls for her. Priya is the sister of rich industrialist Nanda (Prakash) who is extremely possessive about her. Knowing his adamant attitude, Guru approaches Nanda and asks for his sister's hand. Enraged upon his daring, Nanda kicks him out of the house. But Guru silently woos Priya and both fall in love. Nanda uses his money power to break this alliance in several attempts but fails. Later Guru takes up a challenge to win over Priya using his money power and succeeds.

Cast 
 Yogesh as Guru
 Aindrita Ray as Priya
 Prakash Raj as Nanda
 Om Prakash Rao, Nanda's PA
 Achyuth Kumar, Guru's Father
 Sudha Belawadi, Guru's Mother
 Richard Louis
 Mandeep Roy
 Sudheendra

Production
The film began its principal photography in 2009 and the first schedule was completed by 11 September 2009. It was reported that the actor Prakash Rai was paid 40 Lakhs for his role.

Soundtrack 

The audio was launched on Akshaya Audio label. The audio launch event was held at Bangalore with actor Yogesh presence. Actress Aindrita Ray was absent at the event as she was away on a trip. There was a row between actress and director over her absence which was amicably solved later. The song "Amma Loosa" was hugely popular among the masses and was on top of the dance charts for many weeks.

Reception

Critical response 

Shruti Indira Lakshminarayana from Rediff.com scored the film at 3 out of 5 stars and says "Dhool has nothing new to offer in terms of story. In fact it is inspired by Tamil super hit film Thiruvilleyadal Aarambam. The film makes an enjoyable one time watch because of its comedy and its punches. Yogi won't disappoint his fans". A critic from The New Indian Express wrote "The movie Dhool is an action oriented flick". Sunayana Suresh from DNA wrote "V Harikrishna has scored some good numbers, especially 'Amma Loosa'. The Dr Rajkumar hit Nanna Neenu Gellalaare, which is recreated featuring Yogesh and Prakash Raj, is quite good too. This makes for a perfect weekend watch". B S Srivani from Deccan Herald wrote "Aindrita is pleasing on the eye. Achyuth, Sudha Belawadi and others add their mite to make the film relatable. Dharani’s screenplay scores that way. Harikrishna’s music has some unusual ‘sounds’ but except for the “Loosa” song the rest don’t make the cut".

References 

2011 films
2010s Kannada-language films
Indian romantic comedy films
2011 romantic comedy films
Kannada remakes of Tamil films
Films scored by V. Harikrishna